Chalkai was a town in ancient Thessaly. 

Its site is tentatively located near Nikaia Larisis.

References

Populated places in ancient Thessaly
Former populated places in Greece